Yessica Guadalupe Ramírez Meza represented the Mexican state of Baja California in the national pageant Nuestra Belleza México. She represent Mexico in the Miss World 2004 pageant, held in Sanya, China on December 4, 2004. During the pageant, Ramírez was a semi-finalist and was also awarded the title of Miss World Top Model. She was born in Culiacán, Sinaloa, but raised in Tijuana, Baja California.

See also
 Rosalva Luna
 Nuestra Belleza México 2003
 Miss World 2004

References

Living people
Year of birth missing (living people)
Nuestra Belleza México winners
Miss World 2004 delegates
People from Tijuana
People from Culiacán
Models from Sinaloa
Models from Baja California